Milltown is a hamlet in Cornwall, England. It lies in Lanlivery civil parish, about a mile south of Lostwithiel, in the valley of a small tributary of the River Fowey.

Cornwall has another hamlet called Milltown, in the parish of Cardinham.

References

Hamlets in Cornwall